Ricinodendreae is a tribe of the subfamily Crotonoideae, under the family Euphorbiaceae. It comprises 3 genera.  

 Givotia  (from east Africa, Madagascar, India and Sri Lanka), 
Givotia gosai 
Givotia madagascariensis 
Givotia moluccana 
Givotia stipularis 

Ricinodendron  (from Tropical Africa),
Ricinodendron heudelotii 

Schinziophyton  (from Angola, Botswana, Malawi, Mozambique, Namibia, Tanzania, Zambia, Zaïre and Zimbabwe),
Schinziophyton rautanenii 

Notable species include mongongo (Schinziophyton rautanenii) and njangsa (Ricinodendron heudelotii).

Phylogeny
According to the Open Tree of Life, phylogenetic analysis suggests the following relationships amongst genera.

See also
 Taxonomy of the Euphorbiaceae

References

External links

Crotonoideae
Euphorbiaceae tribes